RapidBlocs are a movable obstacle system for artificial whitewater courses.  The system was developed by Scott Shipley of S2o Design and Engineering and Andy Laird of Engineering Paddler Design.  The system was developed for the Lee Valley White Water Centre that was used for the 2012 London Olympic Games.  The system is made of modular blocs, among other shapes, that can be secured via unistrut at any point in a compatible channel.  The blocs are stackable and can therefore be combined to create a variety of shapes.  These shapes are configured to create waves, eddies, other hydraulic jumps.  There are also a variety of utilitarian configurations that can be created to make stairs, rescue platforms, and to configure varying rescue scenarios for rescue training.  At the London Games the RapidBloc system created all of the waves and features and was also used to create the starting gate.

The system has been used in a variety of channels.  These channels were either custom built for the system—as was the Lee Valley White Water Centre—or have been retrofitted to an existing channel as in the case of the Tees Barrage Whitewater Park and the Prague Troja Whitewater Park.

References

Canoeing and kayaking equipment